Shayan is a Persian given name that may refer to

Shayan Chowdhury Arnob (born 27 January 1979), Bangladeshi musician, singer and composer
Shayan Modarres (born 1984), Iranian-American civil rights activist and attorney
Shayan Munshi, Indian model and actor 

Persian masculine given names